Geba is a syllabic script for the Naxi language. It is called ¹Ggo¹baw in Naxi, adapted as Geba, 哥巴, in Chinese. Some glyphs resemble the Yi script, and some appear to be adaptations of Chinese characters. Geba is used only to transcribe mantras, and there are few texts, though it is sometimes used to annotate dongba pictographs.
Geba's phonetics can vary depending on who is using it. Symbols do not have fixed phonetic values, and they may have the same phonetic values as well.

See also
Naxi script

External links
Dr. Richard S. Cook, Naxi Pictographic and Syllabographic Scripts: Research notes toward a Unicode encoding of Naxi 
Naxi scripts at Omniglot

Syllabary writing systems
Naxi language
Writing systems derived from the Chinese